The Philippine Society of Information Technology Educators (PSITE) is a professional body of information technology education practitioners in the Philippines. Its members are primarily academics; teachers of computer science, information technology, information and communication technology, engineering, mathematics and other allied fields. Industrial practitioners, however, such as programmers, systems analysts, web developers and others are welcomed as well.

See also 
 Philippine Youth Congress in Information Technology
 University of the Philippines Information Technology Training Center
 Association for Computing Machinery
 IEEE Computer Society
 Information and Communication Technology (education)

External links 
 PSITE National Convention 2009

Professional associations based in the Philippines
Information technology organizations based in Asia
Information technology education